These are list of actors in Kannywood film industry.

A 

 Adam A. Zango

 Ali Nuhu

Aminu Shariff

H

 Hadiza Aliyu

 Hafsat Idris

Halima Atete

M 

 Maryam Yahaya

N 

 Nuhu Abdullahi
 Nafisat Abdullahi

 Nura M Inuwa

R 

 Rabilu Musa
Rahama Sadau

S 

 Sadiq Sani Sadiq

 Sani Musa Danja

 Saratu Gidado

U 

Usman Baba Pategi

Uzee Usman

Y 

 Yakubu Muhammad

References 

Hausa-language culture